The following is a list of the 392 communes of the Ain department of France.

The communes cooperate in the following intercommunalities (as of 2020):
Communauté d'agglomération du Bassin de Bourg-en-Bresse
Haut-Bugey Agglomération
Communauté d'agglomération du Pays de Gex
Mâconnais Beaujolais Agglomération (partly)
Communauté d'agglomération Villefranche Beaujolais Saône (partly)
Communauté de communes Bresse et Saône
Communauté de communes Bugey Sud
Communauté de communes de la Côtière à Montluel
Communauté de communes de la Dombes
Communauté de communes Dombes Saône Vallée
Communauté de communes de Miribel et du Plateau
Communauté de communes du Pays Bellegardien
Communauté de communes de la Plaine de l'Ain
Communauté de communes Rives de l'Ain - Pays du Cerdon
Communauté de communes Usses et Rhône (partly)
Communauté de communes Val de Saône Centre
Communauté de communes de la Veyle

List of communes

References 

Ain